Otton Mieczysław Żukowski (Bełz on the Sołokija, 8 March 1867 – 31 March 1942) was a Polish composer. He also worked as a publisher of music for male and mixed choirs.

References

External links
 Scores by Otton Mieczysław Żukowski in digital library Polona

1867 births
1931 deaths
Polish composers
Choral composers
20th-century Polish musicians
20th-century composers
Male composers
People from Lviv Oblast
20th-century male musicians